Sloanea shankii is a species of plant in the Elaeocarpaceae family. It is endemic to Honduras.

References

shankii
Endemic flora of Honduras
Critically endangered flora of North America
Taxonomy articles created by Polbot